"In and Out of Love" is a 1967 song recorded by The Supremes for the Motown label.  It was the second single issued with the group's new billing of Diana Ross & the Supremes, the penultimate Supremes single written and produced by Motown production team Holland–Dozier–Holland, and the last single to feature the vocals of original member Florence Ballard.

Recording
By the time of the recording of "In and Out of Love," The Supremes had become the most successful American music group of all time, with ten number-one pop singles on the Billboard Hot 100 to their credit. In the midst of their success, conflicts between Supremes members Diana Ross, Florence Ballard and Mary Wilson arose. Ballard was uneasy about the group's direction and felt her role was being reduced in the group she first founded.

Motown's premier production team Holland–Dozier–Holland (H–D–H) recorded the track for "In and Out of Love" originally in Detroit with the Funk Brothers on March 2, 1967 during the same session for "The Happening" and "Reflections," but subsequently rerecorded the track six weeks later in Los Angeles. Ross added her lead vocals on June 12, 1967 with Wilson and Ballard adding their vocals the following day on June 13. It would be Ballard's final session as a Supreme.

By mid-1967, H–D–H, like Ballard, grew increasingly frustrated with their position at Motown. Lyricist Eddie Holland convinced his brother Brian Holland and their partner Lamont Dozier to stage a work slowdown, and for much of 1967 the trio turned out virtually no product. After one last Supremes single, "Forever Came Today," in early 1968, H–D–H left Motown, prompting a series of lawsuits between the label and the songwriters that lasted over a decade.

By July 1967, Motown CEO Berry Gordy had fired Ballard, replacing her with Cindy Birdsong of Patti LaBelle & the Blue Belles. One week after her dismissal, the vocals of Ballard and fellow member Mary Wilson were overdubbed by in-house session singers the Andantes and multitracked for the final single. Diana Ross & The Supremes performed "In and Out of Love" live on CBS's The Ed Sullivan Show on Sunday, November 19, 1967.

The single proved immensely popular with the fans as it was chosen by American Bandstand voters to be the song they wanted for that summer's dance contest. It remained at #1 for 4 (four) weeks on the American Bandstand chart.

Reception
The release of "In and Out of Love" was successful, peaking at number nine on the Billboard Hot 100, number 16 on the R&B Singles chart, and number 13 on the UK Singles Chart in late autumn 1967.  The single also reached number 10 on the Cashbox chart.  Cash Box said that it has "a witty combination of orchestration and beat a la Motor City with the sweep and splendor of a folk-country ballad."

Personnel
Lead vocals by Diana Ross
Background vocals by Florence Ballard, Mary Wilson, and the Andantes (Jackie Hicks, Marlene Barrow and Louvain Demps)
Instrumentation by Los Angeles musicians

Track listing
7" single (25 October 1967) (North America/United Kingdom/Spain)
"In and Out of Love" – 2:36
"I Guess I'll Always Love You" – 2:43

Charts

Weekly charts

Year-end charts

References

1967 singles
The Supremes songs
Songs written by Holland–Dozier–Holland
Motown singles
Psychedelic soul songs
1967 songs
Song recordings produced by Brian Holland
Song recordings produced by Lamont Dozier